Penna is a surname originating in Italy, in an area known as the Papal States. Since Papal names often denoted place of origin, the Penna family lived in one of several places in Italy named Penna.

Its origins are unrelated to the Hispanic surname Peña or Della Peña, though many have adopted the extra n to become Della Penna.

Penna is also the surname of many families in India. Their origins are usually in and around Pennariver, in the south of Andhra Pradesh.

Penna is also a surname of Cornish origin. At the time of the British Census of 1881, its frequency was highest in Cornwall (over 72 times the national average) followed by Cumberland, Caernarfonshire and County Durham. In all other British counties, its frequency was below national average. Traditional Cornish surnames tend to start with 'Tre', 'Pol' or 'Pen'. To quote a Cornish saying "By the Tre, Pol and Pen, you can tell the Cornishmen". Following the collapse of mining in the 18th and 19th centuries; many Cornish folk emigrated in the great Cornish diaspora. As a result of this, the name Penna can be found in many mining centers around the world, notably the Australia, Brazil, Canada, Mexico, New Zealand, South Africa and the United States.

People 

Angel Penna (disambiguation)
Carlos Victor Penna (1911–1998), Argentine library planner and organizer
Claudio Della Penna (born 1989 in Rome), an Italian football striker
David "Dave" Penna (1958–2004), US jockey
Dolores Della Penna (1954–1972), 17-year-old Philadelphian schoolgirl
Domingos Soares Ferreira Penna (1818–1888), Brazilian naturalist
Francesco Orazio Olivieri della Penna (1680–1745), Capuchin missionary to Tibet
Gal Costa (born Maria da Graça Costa Penna Burgos; born 1945, Salvador, Bahia), Brazilian singer of popular music
Joe Penna, Brazilian guitarist, animator, and filmmaker
José Luiz Penna (born 1945), Brazilian businessman, musician and politician
Lucas de Penna (Luca da Penne, Luca da Penna, Luca De Penna; c. 1325 – c. 1390), 14th century Neapolitan jurist and judge
Phil Penna (1857–1939), American labor leader
Roberto Penna, Italian athlete
Sandro Penna (1906, Perugia – 1977, Rome), Italian poet
Toney G. Penna (1908–1995), Italian-American professional golfer
Vinnie Penna, voice actor

See also 
 Della Penna, an Italian and Spanish language surname

References

Cornish-language surnames
Italian-language surnames
Indian surnames